Laura Esterman is an American actress, known for portraying Ruby the Galactic Gumshoe in contemporary radio dramas, and for her Drama Desk Award and Obie Award winning performance in the 1992 original stage production of Scott McPherson's Marvin's Room.

Early life
Esterman studied acting at HB Studio.

Career 
Esterman made her Broadway debut in the 1969 revival of The Time of Your Life. Her other Broadway credits include The Waltz of the Toreadors, God's Favorite, Teibele and Her Demon, The Suicide, Metamorphosis and The Show-Off.

In 1972, Esterman played the Madonna Vampyra in the ZBS Foundation radio play The Fourth Tower of Inverness, the first in the long-running Jack Flanders series. Esterman returned to ZBS in 1982 to star as the title character in the first Ruby the Galactic Gumshoe serial, and has reprised the role many times in the decades to come, most recently Ruby 10 in 2018. Many of her Ruby appearances are credited to a stage name, "Blanche Blackwell". Esterman also returned as the Madonna Vampyra in the 2000 sequel, Return to Inverness.

Esterman has also worked in television and film. Her television credits include Remington Steele, St. Elsewhere, The Facts of Life, L.A. Law, Family Ties, Law & Order, Third Watch and Law & Order: Special Victims Unit among others. Her movie credits include Alone in the Dark, Ironweed, Awakenings, The Doors, Addams Family Values, The Confession and Arranged among others.

Filmography

Film

Television

References

External links

Internet Theatre Database
Filmography by Starpulse
Drama Desk Award and Obie Award for her  performance in Marvin's Room, by Scott McPherson
Television appearances
Production notes for Suspended Animation

Living people
American film actresses
Drama Desk Award winners
Actresses from New York City
Obie Award recipients
American television actresses
Jewish American actresses
21st-century American Jews
21st-century American women
Year of birth missing (living people)